Sagebrush Trail (UK title An Innocent Man) is a 1933 American Pre-Code Western film with locations filmed at Bronson Canyon starring John Wayne and featuring Lane Chandler and Yakima Canutt (Canutt plays the leader of the gang as well as doubling for Wayne in several stunts). It was the second Lone Star Productions film released by Monogram Pictures. It was shown as An Innocent Man in the UK, and this version was later released in a colorized version on home video.

Plot
Sentenced for a murder he did not commit, John Brant escapes from prison determined to find the real killer. By chance Brant's narrow escape from lawmen is witnessed by Joseph Conlon who goes by the name of "Jones".  Giving Brant the name of "Smith" Conlon, Jones gets him into his outlaw gang hiding out in an abandoned mine. Brant attempts to disrupt the outlaw gang's robberies and comes closer to finding his man.

The gang leader suspects John Brant/Smith but Joseph/Jones Conlon consoles him & takes him on a test run to recon a grocery store with a safe in it. John Brant writes a note to the grocery clerk  (Sally Blake) warning her of the impending robbery. When Jones & Smith return later that night to rob the store the Sheriff & his Deputy are waiting. They shoot Smith who is taken by Jones to "Blind Pete's" to recover. This first robbery was deliberately spoiled by Smith in July.

In August we see Smith is fully recovered & Jones visits him & encourages him to join them in an attempt to rob a stagecoach carrying the payroll for miners. Suspecting Smith Jones disinvites him & goes to rob the coach himself with the gang. Smith intercepts the coach & robs the coach before hand, then informs Sally & asks her to tell the Sheriff to pick up the robbed money, thereby saving the payroll from being robbed.

Jones suspects Smith but is not sure. The gang leader also suspects Smith so this time he deliberately gives Smith a false tip. Jones decides to follow Smith to see if he will betray them. He soon discovers that Smith views him as a friend & took the fall for him & went to jail for him. Jones decides to save Smith who is now walking back to the gang - who are waiting to ambush him.

As Smith is about to be ambushed, Jones warns him to take cover & the two start fighting the gang surrounding them. They mount a stagecoach & escape the encircling gang. Meanwhile Sally the grocery girl on Jones'  exhortation gets the help of the Sheriff and their posse & then rush to save both Jones & Smith.

Jones & Smith outrun the entire gang & then Smith drops behind & starts picking off the gang members one by one until he gets the last one. Jones however is shot & his stagecoach falls off a cliff. By the time Smith reaches Jones the Sheriff & his deputies also catch up. They hold both of them but Jones confesses to the crimes that he committed getting Smith exonerated. Smith goes off to kiss Sally as the credits roll.

Cast

 John Wayne as John Brant
 Nancy Shubert as Sally Blake
 Lane Chandler as Joseph Conlon
 Yakima Canutt as Outlaw Gang Leader
 Wally Wales as Deputy Sheriff
 Art Mix as Henchman
 Bob Burns as Sheriff Parker
 Ted Adams as Taggart (uncredited)
 Silver Tip Baker as Townsman (uncredited)
 Hank Bell as Henchman (uncredited)
 William Dyer as Blind Pete (uncredited)
 Wally Howe as Store Customer (uncredited)
 Julie Kingdon as Town Girl (uncredited)
 Tex Palmer as Posse Rider (uncredited)
 Tex Phelps as Henchman (uncredited)
 Hal Price as Bud - Train Engineer (uncredited)
 Archie Ricks as Stage Driver (uncredited)
 Robert Walker as Henchman (uncredited)
 Blackjack Ward as Henchman (uncredited)
 Slim Whitaker as Henchman Dick (uncredited)

See also
 John Wayne filmography

References

External links

 
 
 
 

1933 films
1933 Western (genre) films
1930s English-language films
American Western (genre) films
American black-and-white films
Films directed by Armand Schaefer
Monogram Pictures films
1930s American films